Colfax County Courthouse may refer to:

Colfax County Courthouse (Nebraska), Schuyler, Nebraska
Colfax County Courthouse (Raton, New Mexico), current facility in Raton, New Mexico
Colfax County Courthouse (Springer, New Mexico), a former courthouse
Colfax County Courthouse, a building in the Cimarron Historic District, Cimarron, New Mexico